Martin Walls  (born Brighton, England) is a British-American poet and the first British-born winner of the US Library of Congress Witter Bynner Fellowship.

Biography
Martin Walls was born in Brighton, England in 1970 and now lives in Baldwinsville, New York with his wife, Christine, and their child Alex. A US Library of Congress Witter Bynner Fellow, he is the author of three books of poems: Small Human Detail in Care of National Trust (2000), Commonwealth (2005), and The Solvay Process (2009).

In addition, Walls edits the "online anthology" The Book of Snails, a collection of poetry and science writing.

Walls's collaboration with photographer Philip MacCabe and graphic designer Shadric Toop can be found at smallhumandetail.com. His blog on sustainability and going green can be read at amosoneplanet.blogspot.com.

Walls's poetry has been published in The Nation, The Ohio Review, Salt Hill, Epoch, The Gettysburg Review, Boulevard, Five Points, Kestrel, Blackbird, Commonweal, Beloit Poetry Journal, and elsewhere.

He holds a BA (Hons) from the University of East Anglia, England. He also attended Purdue University, from which he holds an M.F.A. degree.

He has taught poetry writing at Ball State University and the Downtown Writers Center, part of the Syracuse YMCA Y Arts curriculum. He has also taught at Syracuse University, Onondaga Community College, Cazenovia College, and SUNY Cortland.

In Syracuse he was a journalist and editor at Eagle Newspapers, where he founded the Solvay-Geddes Express newspaper. As a senior editor at Bentley-Hall, Inc., he helped found Making Music, a magazine for amateur musicians. Walls also edited International Musician for the American Federation of Musicians. Walls plays drums, percussion, and resonator guitar.

Walls is communications manager for the Institute for National Security and Counterterrorism at Syracuse University. He has been communications manager at the Syracuse Center of Excellence in Environmental and Energy Systems and the Syracuse University Office of Community Engagement and Economic Development. He has also performed communications work for Syracuse University Project Advance, AMP Urology, CNY Jazz Central, and the Bluebell Railway.

Awards
 2010 Syracuse University Whitman School "40 Under 40" Award
 2005 Witter Bynner Fellowship of the US Library of Congress
 2000 A. Brohman Roth "Newcomer Award" from the Syracuse Press Club
 1998 The Nation/"Discovery" prize
 Breadloaf Writers Conference scholarship
 Two individual artist grants from the Syracuse Cultural Resources Council

Works
 "Cicadas at the End of Summer", Poetry Foundation
 "A BEND IN ONONDAGA CREEK", VALPARAISO POETRY REVIEW
 "Crows", Blackbird
 
 
 
 The Solvay Process 
 The Book of Snails

References

External links
 "Martin Walls", Library of Congress
 The Book of Snails

1970 births
Living people
Alumni of the University of East Anglia
Purdue University alumni
British poets
British expatriates in the United States
Ball State University faculty
People from Brighton
British male poets